These are the results of the men's K-2 1000 metres competition in canoeing at the 2004 Summer Olympics. The K-2 event is raced by two-man canoe sprint kayaks.

Medalists

Heats
The 16 teams first raced in two heats.  The top 3 teams in each heat advanced directly to the final, and the next nine fastest teams advanced to the semifinal, eliminating one team.  The heats were raced on August 23.

Semifinal
The top three teams in the semifinal qualified for the final, joining the six teams that qualified directly from the heats.  The other six teams were eliminated from the competition.   The semifinal was raced on August 25.

China, competing in Lane 1, was disqualified for competing too close to the buoy line from the 950 meter mark to the finish.

Final
The final was raced on August 27.

References
2004 Summer Olympics Canoe sprint results 
Sports-reference.com 2004 K-2 1000 m results.
Yahoo! Sports Athens 2004 Summer Olympics Canoe/Kayak Results

Men's K-2 1000
Men's events at the 2004 Summer Olympics